Dong Yuan (Gan: dung3 ngion4; c. 934 – c. 962) was a Chinese painter.

He was born in Zhongling (钟陵; present-day Jinxian County, Jiangxi Province). Dong Yuan was active in the Southern Tang Kingdom of the Five Dynasties and Ten Kingdoms period. He was from Nanjing, which was a center for culture and the arts.

He was known for both figure and landscape paintings, and exemplified the elegant style which would become the standard for brush painting in China for the next nine centuries. He and his pupil Juran were the founders of the Southern style of landscape painting, known as the Jiangnan Landscape style. Together with Jing Hao and Guan Tong of the Northern style they constituted the four seminal painters of that time.

As with many artists in China, his profession was as an official, here he studied the existing styles of Li Sixun and Wang Wei. However, he added to these masters' techniques; he included more sophisticated perspective.

Works
The Xiao and Xiang Rivers or Scenes along the Xiao and Xiang Rivers, a painting on silk (49.80 cm by 141.30 cm), is one of his best-known masterpieces.  It demonstrates his exquisite techniques, and his sense of composition. The clouds break the background mountains into a central pyramid composition and a secondary pyramid, by softening the mountain line, he makes the immobile effect more pronounced.

The inlet by breaking the landscape into groups makes the serenity of the foreground more pronounced, instead of simply being a border to the composition, it is a space of its own, into which the boat on the far right intrudes, even though it is tiny compared to the mountains. Left of center, he uses his unusual brush stroke techniques, later copied in countless paintings, to give a strong sense of foliage to the trees, which contrasts with the rounded waves of stone that make up the mountains themselves. This gives the painting a more distinct middle ground, and makes the mountains have an aura and distance which gives them greater grandeur and personality. He also used "face like" patterns in the mountain on the right. A painting attributed to Dong Yuan, The Riverbank, is housed in the Metropolitan Museum of Art, and was a gift from New York financier Oscar Tang, though some scholars believe it may be a modern forgery by Zhang Daqian.

Gallery

See also
Culture of the Song Dynasty
Chinese painting
Chinese art
Eight Views of Xiaoxiang
History of Chinese art
Xiaoxiang
Xiaoxiang poetry

Notes

References
Ci hai bian ji wei yuan hui. Ci hai. Shanghai: Shanghai ci shu chu ban she, 1979.

External links
 Dong Yuan and his painting gallery at China Online Museum
Landscapes Clear and Radiant: The Art of Wang Hui (1632-1717), an exhibition catalog from The Metropolitan Museum of Art (fully available online as PDF), which contains material on Dong Yuan (see index)
"Riverbank", painting in the collection of the Metropolitan Museum, New York

930s births
962 deaths
Year of birth uncertain
Southern Tang painters
Five Dynasties and Ten Kingdoms landscape painters
People from Nanchang
Painters from Jiangxi
10th-century Chinese painters